Ross Jungnickel (1875-1962) was an American music publisher and arranger, and founder of a Baltimore Symphony Orchestra, a precursor to the modern organization of that name. He was a graduate of the Peabody Conservatory. He also composed an orchestral version of Adagio Pathetique, by Benjamin Godard, which was published in 1910.

References

1875 births
1962 deaths
American male composers
American composers
Musicians from Baltimore